The APBA Gold Cup (originally known simply as the Gold Cup, a speedboat race) is an American  hydroplane boat race, named for the American Power Boat Association. It is now run as part of the H1 Unlimited season.

Starting in 1904, the Gold Cup consist of three heats, and starting in 1918 the heat distance was 30 statute miles. In 1963 the number of heats was increased to four, but the total distance was reduced to 60 statute miles. In 1976, the Unlimited Racing Commission adopted a winner-take-all format for all its races including the God Cup. In 1981 the total number of heats was reduced to three with the total distance being reduced to 45 statute miles. Since 1983 the Gold Cup has been competed at various total distances ranging from 36 statute miles to 52.5 statute miles.

The driver with the most Gold Cup victories is Chip Hanauer, with 11 victories.  Dave Villwock is second, with 10, and Bill Muncey is third, with eight.

List of Gold Cup winners

Source: 

Notes:

1960:  Heat 1A completed.  Second half of first heat was abandoned when Gale V crashed in Heat 1B.  By rule, two heats were required to be completed for an official meeting for series championship purposes.  Round abandoned and cancelled by APBA because of high winds.

2008:  Heats 1A, 1B, 2A, and 2B completed.  Round abandoned after crash in Heat 3A and high winds, declared No Contest by APBA.  American Boat Racing Association (now H1 Unlimited) officials declared the round official as nine boats started the first heat, and two heats were completed when an official round requires four boats start the first heat.  U-5 FormulaBoats.com (Jeff Bernard, driver) declared round winner with 850 points (fifth in qualifying, first in heat 1B, and first in heat 2B) when meeting abandoned after it was official.

References

External links
American Power Boat Association website
H1 Unlimited website
Unlimited NewsJournal website

H1 Unlimited
Racing motorboats
Hydroplanes
Motorboat racing
Annual sporting events in the United States
Recurring sporting events established in 1904
Racing
Sports trophies and awards
1904 establishments in Michigan
1916 establishments in Michigan